Luisa Fernanda is a Venezuelan telenovela developed by Xiomara Moreno and produced by Radio Caracas Televisión in 1999. The telenovela is a free version of the radionovela Muchachas de hoy written by  Inés Rodena.

Scarlet Ortiz and Guillermo Perez starred as the protagonists with Dora Mazzone and Ricardo Álamo as antagonists.

Plot
Three women will fall in love without thinking of the consequences of their passions. One of them is Luisa Fernanda, a rich, capricious and spoilt girl who is ignored by her father Ignacio Riera who despite being one of the most successful lawyers in Caracas is an alcoholic. The second is Alejandra, her friend, who claims to have found Fabian, the man of her dreams without knowing he is married. The third is Miriam, a girl from the countryside whose parents make sacrifices to fund her university education. She makes everyone believe she is rich but find it hard keeping appearances.

Luisa Fernanda falls in love with Professor Rodolfo Arismendi who begins teaching at the university where she studies law. Rodolfo is the boyfriend of Professor Alicia, an unscrupulous woman who pretends to be an angel in front of Rodolfo but is envious of Luisa Fernanda and hates her. To get back at Alicia, Luisa Fernanda makes a bet to seduce Rodolfo and take him away from her, but she ends up falling in love with him instead. The women’s brave pilgrimage empowers them to learn as they go, ultimately amassing the wisdom and inner strength necessary for finding the purity and power of real love.

Cast
 Scarlet Ortiz as Luisa Fernanda Riera
 Guillermo Perez as Rodolfo Arismendi
 Flavio Caballero as Ignacio Riera
 Crisol Carabal as Miriam Linares
 Beatriz Valdes as Dinora Rodriguez
 Dora Mazzone as Alicia Suarez
 Henry Soto as Fabian Salgado
 Dilia Waikaram as Juanita
 Manuel Salazar as Vicenzio
 Humberto Garcia as Justo
 Chony Fuentes as Liliana de Arismendi
 Ricardo Álamo as Miguel Enrique
 Dessideria D'Caro as Alejandra 
 Yul Bürkle as Gustavo Cazan 
 Yoletty Cabrera as Gladys
 Gladiuska Acosta as Bombon
 Julio Cesar Castro as El Topo
 Gabriela Babino as Dubraska
 Ivan Tamayo as Mauricio Toscano
 Carlos Guillermo Haydon as Victor
 Maria Eugenia Favaro as Leticia Toscano
 Jennifer Milano as Laura Negrin
 Johnny Zapata as Taxista
 Angel Javier Bastardo as Picture

References

External links
 Luisa Fernanda at the Internet Movie Database
 Foro.telenovela-world.com
 Opening credits

1999 telenovelas
RCTV telenovelas
Venezuelan telenovelas
1999 Venezuelan television series debuts
1999 Venezuelan television series endings
Spanish-language telenovelas
Television shows set in Caracas